Hark Olufs (July 17 or 19, 1708 in Nebel – October 13, 1754) was a North Frisian sailor. He was captured by Algerian pirates and sold into slavery. By successfully working as a slave servant to the Bey of Constantine, he eventually obtained his freedom from captivity.

Life
Hark Olufs was born as son of a nautical captain named Oluf Jensen on either July 17 or 19 in 1708 on the North Frisian island of Amrum, which then belonged to Denmark. In 1721 he became a seaman on the Hoffnung, a ship belonging to his father. 

In 1724, on a voyage from Nantes to Hamburg, Olufs’ ship was seized by Algerian pirates and he, and his two cousins, were taken hostage. Olufs' family could not afford the high price which was demanded in ransom by the Barbary slave traders for his release. Because the ship had been sailing under Hamburg colours, the family's request for a loan from the slavery fund of the Danish Kingdom was rejected.

Subsequently, Olufs was sold as a slave on Algiers' slave market. From 1724 to 1727/28 he was a slave servant of the Bey of Constantine and advanced in responsibility to become the Bey's treasurer. Between 1728 and 1732 he was made Commander of the Life Guards. In 1732 he became Agha ed-Deira, Commander in Chief of the local cavalry. In 1735, he took part in the conquest of Tunis by the Algerian army during the disposal of Al-Husayn I ibn Ali. As a reward, Olufs was released on October 31 and was allowed to return to Amrum. In 1747 he published an autobiography in Danish, which was translated into German in 1751. Hark Olufs died on October 13, 1754, in Süddorf on Amrum. His headstone is still visible in the graveyard of Nebel.

Legacy
Hark Oluf's life was chronicled in a biographical novel in 2010:

See also
Turkish Abductions
Sklavenkasse

References
Notes

Sources

1708 births
1754 deaths
Danish Frisian people
People from Nordfriesland
Ottoman Army officers
Slaves from the Ottoman Empire
North Frisians
Amrum
People who wrote slave narratives
Converts to Islam
18th-century slaves
Danish slaves
Danish autobiographers
Slavery in Algeria